EGS may refer to:

Education
 Enfield Grammar School, an English school
 Ermysted's Grammar School, an English school
 European Graduate School, a Swiss private university

Science
 Edinburgh Geological Society
 EGS (program), a Monte Carlo simulation program
 Ehlers–Geren–Sachs theorem
 Enhanced geothermal system
 European Geophysical Society, now part of the European Geosciences Union

Technology
 Emergency gas supply
 Enhanced Graphics System, on the Amiga computer
 Epic Games Store, a digital video game storefront
 Ergis (company), a Polish chemical company
 Experimental Geodetic Satellite, a Japanese satellite
 Exploration Ground Systems, a NASA program

Other uses
 Ecological goods and services
 Egilsstaðir Airport in Iceland
 El Goonish Shive, a webcomic by Keenspot CTO Dan Shive
 Expert Global Solutions, a defunct American debt collection agency